Ski jumping at the 1994 Winter Olympics consisted of three events held from 20 February to 25 February, taking place at Lysgårdsbakken.

Medal summary

Medal table

Germany led the medal table with two gold medals, and three overall.

Events

Participating NOCs
Nineteen nations participated in ski jumping at the Lillehammer Games. Belarus, the Czech Republic, Georgia, Kazakhstan, Russia, Slovakia and Ukraine made their Olympic ski jumping debuts.

References

 
1994 Winter Olympics events
1994
1994 in ski jumping
Ski jumping competitions in Norway